Carr Creek State Park is a park located along Kentucky Route 15 in Knott County, Kentucky, United States.

The park contains a 39-site campground, a full-service marina with snack bar, boat rental service, and a beach.

References

State parks of Kentucky
Protected areas of Knott County, Kentucky
Protected areas established in 1997